DDWG may refer to:
 Digital Display Working Group, an industry consortium that developed the DVI standard.
 W3C Device Description Working Group, a part of the W3C Mobile Web Initiative.